The "90th Anniversary of the Armed Forces of the Republic of Azerbaijan (1918–2008)" Medal is a commemorative medal of Azerbaijan issued to denote the 90th anniversary of the formation of the Armed Forces of the Azerbaijan Democratic Republic in 1918. It was established in accordance with the decree of the President of Azerbaijan Ilham Aliyev on May 16, 2008. Eligible personnel include warrant officers and ensigns who succeeded in combat training while serving in the Armed Forces of the Republic of Azerbaijan until June 26, 2008, as well as retired officers who actively participated in the formation and strengthening of the Armed Forces of the Republic of Azerbaijan.

The medal is worn on the left chest, and in the presence of other orders and medals, it is attached after the "10th Anniversary of the Armed Forces of the Republic of Azerbaijan (1991–2001)" Medal.

Description 
The "90th Anniversary of the Armed Forces of the Republic of Azerbaijan (1918–2008)" Medal is a round shaped medal that is made of bronze with a 35 mm diameter which is plated with gold ornaments.

The relief emblem of the Armed Forces of the Republic of Azerbaijan is depicted on the background of the medal where relief rays and a ribbon pass through the center. The words "Republic of Azerbaijan" along the arc, and "Armed Forces" below the arc have been engraved above the emblem. The octagonal star and crescent are white. There are two numbers on the ribbon, "1918" on the left side and "2008" on the right side.

The number "90" is engraved below the center of the medal in white.

The reverse side has a smooth surface and the words "90th Anniversary of the Armed Forces of the Republic of Azerbaijan (1918–2008)" written in the center. An eight-pointed star and crescent are depicted on the national ornament.

References 

2008 establishments in Azerbaijan
Awards established in 2008
Military awards and decorations of Azerbaijan